Mocky (born October 7, 1974) is a Canadian singer, music producer, multi-instrumentalist, songwriter, and composer.

Biography
Mocky was born Dominic Salole in Saskatchewan, Canada. He later moved to Ottawa and Toronto, and then to London, Amsterdam and Berlin. He currently lives in Los Angeles. His father is of Somali descent, but was born in present-day Yemen. His mother is English.

Musical work

Mocky has released eight albums under his own name: In Mesopotamia, Are + Be, Navy Brown Blues, Saskamodie, Key Change, Music Save Me (One More Time), A Day At United and Overtones For The Omniverse . He released them first on his own label Mockyrecordings and the Japanese label Saidera, then on the German labels Gomma and Four Music, as well as on V2 Records in France, and Saskamodie on Crammed Discs. As a producer and songwriter he has worked with artists as diverse as Jamie Lidell, Feist, Kelela, Matt Corby, Miguel Atwood-Ferguson, Vulfpeck, Joey Dosik, Moses Sumney, Selah Sue, Nikka Costa, GZA, Alejandro Jodorowsky, Chilly Gonzales, Peaches and more.

His music is notable for its sense of humour, and for combining elements of hip-hop and experimental sounds into memorable tunes. Mocky's song "Sweet Music" from his first album quickly became an underground hit, especially in Europe.

He was also a member of the groups Puppetmastaz, The Shit, Son, The D.O.M, the Freeway Band, and The Roustabouts.

In December 2008, Mocky announced the 2009 release of his new and mostly instrumental album Saskamodie on the Crammed Discs label. The album was released to wide critical acclaim, Pitchfork Media calling it an "exceptional musical album".

In 2012, Mocky publicly announced his move from his longtime home, Berlin, to Los Angeles. In late 2012 he premiered his new song "Little Bird" via The Fader and a video for the new song "Make You Rich" via Vogue.

In February 2013, he released the 7 song EP "Graveyard Novelas (The Moxtape Vol. 1)" and premiered it on Paper

In February 2015, Mocky released the EP "Living Time (The Moxtape Vol. 2)" and in June Mocky released the album "Key Change" on his own Heavy Sheet label.

Mocky released two more editions of his "Moxtapes" in 2016 and 2017 with "The Moxtape Vol. 3" and "How To Hit What And How Hard" and 2018 saw him release a compilation album with the best songs from those Moxtapes and some exclusives as an album entitled "Music Save Me (One More Time). Also in 2018 Mocky started a new series of albums which are recorded in a single day with some of the most exciting and idiosyncratic local musicians in a vintage recording studio and with "A Day At United" released a collection of 9 instrumentals, recorded at United Recording Studios (former home of Frank Sinatra, Nat King Cole and others) in Los Angeles and featuring and incredible cast of LA's finest left of center jazz and funk musicians.

In 2019 Mocky delved into soundtrack work by collaborating with legendary Anime director Shinichiro Watanabe on the first two seasons of the Netflixshow Carole & Tuesday for which he won Best Score at the Anime Awards 2020. In 2020 he started a new Single series with two songs featuring the Portuguese singer Liliana Andrade and in 2021 he released his orchestral album "Overtones For The Omniverse" and a series of Jazz/Funk instrumentals under the title "Goosebumps Per Minute".

The Canadian Crew
Mocky is considered to be a member of the Canadian Crew, a loose collective of immigrant Canadian musicians mostly living in Europe that includes Peaches, Chilly Gonzales, Feist, Taylor Savvy, and others.

Co-writing and co-producing credits
Mocky is also a much sought after live performer, and plays in shows for fellow musicians Gonzales and Jamie Lidell, usually on drums, keyboards, bass or guitar.

In September 2009, Mocky had an appearance by the rapper GZA on his soundtrack-like tune "Birds of a Feather".

In 2010 and 2011 Mocky co-produced the albums Buen Soldado by Francisca Valenzuela, Modern Day Addiction by Clare Bowditch and Metals by Feist.

Mocky has co-written and co-produced songs for:
Jamie Lidell's 2005 album Multiply and 2008 album JIM.
Feist's albums The Reminder (nominated for four grammys) and Metals.

In addition, Mocky co-wrote and co-produced the 2008 album Jim by Jamie Lidell. He also frequently collaborates with musicians Chilly Gonzales and Kevin Blechdom.

Some of Mocky's other co-writing credits include:
 "Bittersweet Melodies", "Graveyard", "Caught A Long Wind" from the album Metals by Feist
"Multiply", "When I Come Back Around", "What's the Use", "What is it this Time" and "Game for Fools" from the album Multiply by Jamie Lidell
"Take me to Broadway" with Gonzales
"So Sorry" from the album The Reminder by Feist
"Another Day", "Wait for me", Out of my System",  "All I Wanna Do", "Little Bit of Feelgood", "Figured me Out", "Green Light", "Rope of Sand" from the album Jim by Jamie Lidell
"Without Love" from the Album Pebble to a Pearl by Nikka Costa
Resolution and "Lay You Down" from the "Resolution EP" by Matt Corby
"Trick of the Light" from the "Live on the Resolution Tour EP" by Matt Corby
"Not Knowing" from the "Grow" Single by Rae Morris
"Floorshow" and "Do It Again" from the "Cut 4 Me" Mixtape by Kelela
"Never Gone" from the album Elsewhere by Denai Moore
"Worth The Wait" by Nils Wülker feat. Jill Scott
"Overthinking" by Romans feat. Mary J. Blige
 "Young Up", "Pleasure", "Any Party", "Baby Be Simple" from the "Pleasure" album by Feist (singer)
"Take Me Apart", "Waitin", "Enough", "Better", "Altadena" from the "Take Me Apart" album by Kelela
 "Rockets" by Lion Babe feat. Moe Mocks
 "Inside Voice", "Take Mine", "Don't Want It To Be Over", "Past The Point", "Emergency Landing" by Joey Dosik
 "Scratch  The Surface" by Moses Sumney
 "Birds Of A Feather" by Vulfpeck
 "Take Me To A Higher Place" by Vulfmon
 "Duplicate" and "Beat100" by Benny Sings feat. Marc Rebillet Cola Boyy

Soundtrack work
In 2011, Mocky composed the soundtrack to Xiaolu Guo's new full-length feature movie UFO in Her Eyes that was filmed in China.

In 2019, he composed the background music for Carole & Tuesday, an anime television series directed by Shinichirō Watanabe for which he was awarded "Best Score" at the Crunchyroll Anime Awards 2020.

Discography

Albums
2002: In Mesopotamia
2004: Are + Be
2006: Navy Brown Blues
2009: Saskamodie
2015: Key Change
2018: Music Save Me (One More Time)
2018: A Day At United
2021: Overtones For The Omniverse
2022: Goosebumps Per Minute

EPs
2013: Graveyard Novelas EP (The Moxtape Vol.1)
2015: Living Time EP (The Moxtape Vol.2)
2016: The Moxtape Vol.3
2017: How To Hit What And How Hard (The Moxtape Vol. IV)

Singles
2005: "Catch a Moment in Time"
2006: "Fightin' Away the Tears" (featuring Feist)
2006: "How Will I Know You?" (featuring Jamie Lidell)
2009: " Birds of a Feather "
2020: " Feeling Like I Like " (feat. Liliana Andrade)
2020: " Little Push " (feat. Liliana Andrade)
2021: " Wavelengths " 
2021: " Refractions "
2022: " Get Down (Before You Lose Control) " (feat. Nia Andrews)

Soundtracks
2011: Ufo in Her Eyes
2019: Carole & Tuesday
2023: Les Cyclades

Production credits and appearances

Albums/Singles
2002: Gonzales – The Entertainist
2002: Puppetmastaz – Zoology
2003: Gonzales – Presidential Suite
2005: Studio R – Clapz
2005: Puppetmastaz – Creature Shock Rock Radio
2005: Kevin Blechdom – Eat My Heart Out
2005: Jamie Lidell – Multiply
2006: Jane Birkin – Fictions
2006: Jamie Lidell – Multiply Additions
2006: Soffy O – The Beauty of It
2007: Micky Green – White T-Shirt
2007: Teki Latex – Party de plaisir
2007: Feist – The Reminder
2008: Jamie Lidell – Jim
2008: Puppetmastaz – The Takeover
2008: Nikka Costa – Pebble to a Pearl
2010  Cibelle – Las Venus Resort Palace Hotel
2011: Francisca Valenzuela – Buen Soldado
2011: Feist – Metals
2012 Y'akoto – Baby Blues
2013 Bassekou Kouyate – Jamako
2013: Rae Morris – Grow (Single)
2013: Matt Corby – Resolution EP
2013: Kelela – Cut 4 Me (Mixtape)
2014 Y'akoto – Moody Blues
2014: Aṣa – The One That Never Comes
2014: Bok Bok feat. Kelela – Melba's Call
2014: P. Morris – Grace
2014: Moses Sumney  – Scratch The Surface (feat. Mocky)
2015: Nils Wülker feat. Jill Scott – Worth The Wait
2015 Jesper Munk – Claim
2015 Denai Moore – Elsewhere
2015 Selah Sue – Reason
2015 Kelela – Hallucinogen EP
2015 Orgone – Beyond The Sun
2016 Nia Andrews – From Here
2016 L'Aupaire – Flowers
2016 Romans feat.  Mary J. Blige – Overthinking
2016 Mr. Oizo – All Wet
2017 Feist – Pleasure
2017 Kelela – Take Me Apart
2017 Kid Fresino – Let Me In (Hair Cut)
2018 Joey Dosik – Inside Voice
2019 Benny Sings – Duplicate
2019 Nia Andrews – No Place Is Safe
2019 Def Sound – Tryin'''
2020 Campanella – Amulue2020 Scherazade – Asile Exquis2020 Son Little – Aloha2020 Austra – Hirodin2021 Blectum From Blechdom – DeepBone2021 Nia Andrews – Silly Boy Blue2021 Pegasus Warning – Inspiration Equation2021 Benny Sings feat. Marc Rebillet Cola Boyy – Beat1002023 Kelela – RavenRemixes
2003: Isolée – "It's About"
2003: V.A. – "Cinemix"
2004: Husky Rescue – "Summertime Cowboy"
2004: Feist – "Mushaboom"
2005: Feist – "Inside and Out"
2006: Jamie Lidell – "What's the Use"
2006: Architecture in Helsinki – "Need to Shout"
2007: Young MC – "Bust a Move"
2008: Anita O'Day – "Tenderly" (Verve Remixed)''
2010: Lagrimas De Soledad (No Existen Palabras) (Mocky Remix)
2011: Lateef The Truthspeaker – "Oakland" (Mocky Remix) ft. Del The Funky Homosapien & The Grouch
2015: Matthew Herbert – "Middle (Mocky Remix)"
2016: Oh Shu - Moebius (Mocky Remix)

References

External links
Official website
MySpace
Mocky page on the Crammed Discs site
Interview in Portuguese Webzine
  with links to Dominic Salole, Musical Truth, Re-run.

1974 births
Living people
Canadian electronic musicians
Black Canadian musicians
Canadian expatriates in Germany
Canadian expatriates in the Netherlands
Canadian expatriates in England
Canadian people of English descent
Canadian people of Somali descent
Musicians from Saskatchewan
Crunchyroll Anime Awards winners